The Hydromylidae are monotypic family of small sea slugs, marine opisthobranch gastropod mollusks in the suborder Gymnosomata, the sea angels.

Hydromyles species are pelagic, carnivorous and viviparous.

Description
The small pelagic snails lack shells (except in their early embryonic stage).  They are carnivores, equipped with swimming parapoda (fleshy, wing-like outgrowths), strong jaws and grasping tentacles, often with suckers resembling those of cephalopods.

Genera and species
Genera and species within the family Hydromylidae include:
Genus Hydromyles Gistl, 1848
 Hydromyles globulosus (Rang, 1825)
 Distribution: East Pacific, North America, western Atlantic.
 Description: This pteropod seizes its prey with its radula. Contrary to most gymnosomatiids, this pteropod has no proboscis and no hooks. It is also unique by having, close to the anal aperture, a sac for hatching its eggs. The larvae develop in this sac and are born as fully developed snails.  In other words, this species is viviparous.

References and external links 
 Martoja, M., 1965. Sur l'incubation et l'existence possible d'une glande endocrine, chez Hydromyles globulosa Rang (Halopsyche Gaudichaudi Keferstein), gastéropode gymnosome. -- C.R. hebd. Séanc. Acad. Sci. Paris, 260: 2907-2909.
 photo of Hydromyles globulosus

 
Taxa named by Alice Pruvot-Fol